Child labour in the diamond industry is a widely reported and criticized issue on diamond industry for using child labour in diamond mines and polishing procedures in poor conditions mainly in India and Africa. In these mines, children come in contact with minerals, oil and machinery exhaust. In 1997, The International Confederation of Free Trade Unions claimed that child labour was prospering in the diamond industry in Western India, where the majority of the world's diamonds are cut and polished while workers are often paid only a fraction of 1% of the value of the stones they cut. 
It is argued that economic growth in Western India in the 1980s–90s was associated with an increase in the number of child workers who do simple, repetitive manual tasks that do not require long years of training or experience in low-paying hazardous working conditions that involve drudgery, and foreclose the option of school education for most of them.

There are organizations and people who try to create a public awareness about the issue, including Janine Roberts, The Anti-Slavery Society, Survival International, IndianNGO, Child Labour News Service (CLNS) managed by the Global March Against Child Labor, and IHS Child Slave Labor News.

The United Nations declared 2021 as the International Year for the Elimination of Child Labour.

Reports

India

In 1997, the International Labour Organization published a report titled Child Labour in the Diamond Industry claiming that child labour is highly prevalent in the Indian diamond industry. Child labourers constitute nearly 3% of the total workforce and the percentage of child labourers is as high as 25% in the diamond industry of Surat. The ICFTU further claimed that child labour was prospering in the diamond industry in western India, where the majority of the world's diamonds are cut and polished. Workers are often paid only a fraction of 1% of the value of the stones they cut.

Pravin Nanavati, a Surat-based diamond businessman argued that, since high cost diamonds could easily be lost or broken while cutting or polishing, employing a child labourer would mean risking "lakhs of rupees."  Some western countries have called for a boycott against the diamond industry for establishing a monopoly in the sector. Mohan Dhabuwala, secretary of The South Gujarat Diamond Workers Association, argued that while child labour is highly prevalent in the construction and hotel industries, there are few child labourers in the diamond industry of Surat, less than 1% according to their surveys, mainly because of stern punishments and penalties for violation of child labour laws.

In 1998, Madhura Swaminathan from the Indira Gandhi Institute of Development Research argued that economic growth in western India had been associated with an increase in the number of child workers over the previous 15 years and that children worked at simple repetitive manual tasks in low-paying hazardous jobs, foreclosing the option of school education.

In 2005, an India-based management consultancy firm, A. F. Ferguson & Co., commissioned a study titled Child Labour from the Gem and Jewellery Industry "to spread awareness about child labour among the people connected with the industry". They studied 663 manufacturing units at 21 different locations in Gujarat, Maharashtra, Rajasthan, West Bengal and Tamil Nadu, as an initiative of the Gem & Jewelry Export Promotion Council. On 12 February, the study was presented at a seminar held by the GJEPC and the Surat Diamond Association, in Surat, India. The report argued that the use of child labour in India's diamond processing industry has been reduced from 0.55% in 1998 to 0.31% in 2005, "while for the synthetic stone industry it is estimated to be two-thirds less".

GJEPC chairman Bakul Mehta claimed that, "some 500 diamond factory owners took an oath in the city of Palanpur, Gujarat, (home town of leading Gujarati diamond merchants) not to employ children in their factories. Similarly, in Surat, 200 factory owners took the oath," and that GJEPC "remain committed to eradicating child labour from the Indian diamond industry". He argued that "...the gem and jewelry industry cannot even think of employing children, not only for moral reasons, but that a child could be injured while polishing or cutting the diamonds."

Africa
On 28 August 2003, BBC News reported that during the 10-year civil war in Sierra Leone children were used as combatants and child labourers in the diamond mines of Koidu in the north-eastern district of Kono. Children aged between 5 and 16 were used in hard labour, for ten hours a day, "digging in soil and gravel, before sifting with a pan for gemstones and shifting heavy mud believed to contain diamonds." In collaboration with World Vision and Aim Sierra Leone, the Ministry of Gender and Children's Affairs registered 1,200 child miners to get them out of the mines.

On 26 June 2009, Human Rights Watch published a 62-page report titled Diamonds in the Rough. Human Rights Abuses in the Marange Diamond Fields of Zimbabwe, based on its researchers' "more than 100 one-on-one interviews with witnesses, local miners, police officers, soldiers, local community leaders, victims and relatives, medical staff, human rights lawyers, and activists in Harare, Mutare, and Marange district in eastern Zimbabwe", conducted in February 2009.

According to the report, "following the discovery of diamonds in Marange in June 2006, the police and army have used brutal force to control access to the diamond fields and to take over unlicensed diamond mining and trading. Some income from the fields has been funnelled to high-level party members of ZANU-PF, which is now part of a power-sharing government that urgently needs revenue as the country faces a dire economic crisis."  According to the report, some children work up to eleven hours per day with no pay, and by the estimate of a local lawyer, up to 300 children continue to work for soldiers in the Marange diamond fields.

In December 2014, the U.S. Department of Labor issued a List of Goods Produced by Child Labor or Forced Labor that mentioned Angola, the Central African Republic, the Democratic Republic of the Congo, Guinea, Liberia, and Sierra Leone as part of the 74 countries with significant incidence of child labor and forced labor as far as the diamond industry is concerned.

Working conditions 

Child Slave Labor News argued that it is reported that in the late 1980s, about 11% and in 1994, 16% of the workforce was underage in diamond industry. "Currently there are over 171 million children that work in hazardous work sites such as factories and mines."

CSLN further argued the diamond mines are dangerous work sites, "open pits of heavy minerals, oil, machinery exhaust, and any other rubbish seeps into". It is reported that diamond miners are exposed health risks and hazards, including malaria, dysentery, cholera and sexual diseases. In addition to those diseases, child labourers who are subjected to working in poor conditions including overcrowding, abuse, long work hours and cheap pay in diamond mines suffer from eye strain, headaches, malnutrition, and respiratory problems. While they are paid for how many diamonds they can polish or cut per day. The ordinary amount of money a worker will get for polishing the uppermost section of a diamond is two rupees, which is below eight US cents, while workers who make smaller diamonds, might be paid 15 to 20 US dollars per week. Child slaves in Surat sleep in their workplace or in a small hovel instead of a home. The International Confederation of Free Trade Unions has claimed that child labour was prospering in the diamond industry in Western India, where the majority of the world's diamonds are cut and polished while workers are often paid only a fraction of 1% of the value of the stones they cut in 1997.

Child workers are used as slaves since business owners exploit them as cheap employment to raise more profit and diamond industry is "an infamous venue of exploitation towards youth workers" like mines and sweatshops in South Africa or India while the diamond is overpriced and funded for wars. The majority of the third world country families are poor therefore rely on their children's income to survive. Additionally since most children do not have the opportunity to gain an education from their local school system, working at a sweatshop is their only option in life. In other instances, employers pays the family in advance and in turn, the child works to pay off the debt, which is called bonding, yet bonded children cannot pay their family's debt because of interest. With the increase in owed money, bonded children are forced into a life of servitude which will pass onto their descendants.

On the other hand, Civil wars usually shut down all government services. Countries like Sierra Leone, which depend on diamonds for much of its economic activity, not only face disruption in production (which reduces the supply), but also a thriving black market in conflict diamonds, which drives down the price for what diamonds are produced.

Forceful relocation of indigenous Bushman people by DeBeers 

When the mines are located on the land indigenous people including children, they had to be moved to a different area to construct a mine to collect gems. In Botswana, a long dispute has existed between the interests of the mining company, De Beers, and the relocation of the Bushman tribe from the land to explore diamond resources. The Bushmen have been facing threats from government policies since at least 1980, when the diamond resources were discovered. A campaign is being fought in an attempt to bring an end to what Survival International considers to be a "genocide" of a tribe that has been living in those lands for tens of thousands of years. On the grounds that their hunting and gathering has become "obsolete" and their presence is no longer compatible with "preserving wildlife resources", they were persecuted by the government to make them leave the reserve. To get rid of them, they have had their water supplies cut off, they have been taxed, fined, beaten and tortured. Several international supermodels, including Iman, Lily Cole and Erin O'Connor, who were previously involved with advertising for the companies' diamonds, have backed down after realizing the consequences raised by this scandal, and now support the campaign.

Cultural depictions 

On 4 July 2005 American rap star Kanye West, released a song titled Diamonds from Sierra Leone as the lead single of his second studio album, Late Registration, containing a repeated sample of the theme song for the 1971 James Bond film, Diamonds Are Forever as performed by Shirley Bassey. The song is revealing the hard life of child workers in Sierra Leone, like other West African nations who since 1991 having been forced to mine conflict diamonds and die in civil wars financed by them: "Good Morning! This ain't Vietnam. Still, people lose hands, legs, arms for real/Little was known of Sierra Leone, and how it connect to the diamonds we own...". The music video was directed by Hype Williams and shot entirely in black-and-white in Prague, featuring visuals of young African children toiling away in mines under the careful watch of their wardens with juxtaposed with scenes of wealthy Westerners shopping in boutiques and trying on jewellery.

The song peaked at number forty-three on the Billboard Hot 100, was moderately successful on the iTunes music service, and peaked in the eight spot on the UK Top 40. It won a Grammy Award for Best Rap Song at the 48th Grammy Awards.

See also 

  Blood diamond
 Blood Diamonds (documentary)
 Blood Diamond
  Mining industry of Angola
  Child labour in India#Diamond industry

References

External links
 https://www.hrw.org/en/news/2009/06/26/zimbabwe-end-repression-marange-diamond-fields

 http://www.ilo.org/dyn/clsurvey/lfsurvey.list?p_lang=en&p_country=ZW
 http://allafrica.com/stories/200904100726.html
 https://web.archive.org/web/20090513095730/http://www.dol.gov/ilab/media/reports/iclp/sweat/zimbabwe.htm
 https://www.google.com/hostednews/afp/article/ALeqM5gYqxYwQnE1jmgsg2b07dutMefNJQ

 http://www.wsws.org/articles/2002/oct2002/cong-o26.shtml
 Working and living conditions of miners and local people
 https://web.archive.org/web/20120227012330/http://www.ddiglobal.org/contentDocuments/DDI-Gender-Backgrounder-May-2009-en.PDF
 https://web.archive.org/web/20071215131737/http://www.afrol.com/Countries/DRC/documents/un_resources_2002_govt_zim.htm
 India
 https://web.archive.org/web/20120301123106/http://www.lex.unict.it/eurolabor/ricerca/altri_wp/econ_impact_child.pdf page 14
 Africa
 https://web.archive.org/web/20160527064035/http://www.pacweb.org/Documents/annual-reviews-diamonds/SierraLeone_AR_2004-Eng.pdf
 https://ssrn.com/abstract=917227

Diamond industry
Child labour
Labour relations in India
Mining in Sierra Leone
Child labour in India
Mining in Guinea
Diamond industry in India